Will Metcalf (born June 6, 1984, in Conroe, Texas) is a member of the Texas House of Representatives, 16th District, which encompasses Montgomery County, Texas, approximately 55 miles north of Houston.  As of 2021–2022, he is Chairman of the House Administration Committee which oversees all operations of the House, including its rules, policies and procedures, as well as its members, officers, and employees. He also serves on the committees for International Relations & Economic Development, and House State Affairs.

Metcalf's first term as a member of the House began in 2015, following a Special Election held November 4, 2014, to fill the vacancy left by Brandon Creighton's election to the Texas Senate. As of 2022, he has served two terms in the House, and is running for a third term unchallenged in the November 4, 2022 midterm election.

Early life
Will Metcalf is a longtime resident of Montgomery County, Texas, and refers to himself as a "sixth-generation resident of Montgomery county." His early schooling was in the Conroe Independent School District. He graduated from Conroe High School, and attended college at Sam Houston State University where he earned a Bachelor of science degree in Criminal justice.  He and his wife Megan grew up together. They met at First Baptist Conroe, and in 2007, within months after he earned his degree, they were married.

Legislative history
Metcalf became the Republican candidate for the seat vacated by Brandon Creighton, who won a seat in the Texas Senate. Metcalf defeated opponent Ted Seago in the 2014 Republican primary runoffs, and went on to defeat candidate Michael Hayles Sr. (D) and Bob Townsend (L) in the November 4, 2014 Special Election. In November 2018, he retained his seat as the incumbent by defeating Mike Midler (D) with 80.3% of the votes in the general election. In the 2020 election, he was unchallenged and easily retained his seat. He has served two terms in the House, and is running for a third term unchallenged in the November 4, 2022, midterm election.

Positions, memberships, involvement
Metcalf has either served as a member of or involved in the following:
 House Administration Committee, Chairman
 State Affairs Committee, Chairman
 International Relations & Economic Development Committee, member
 Energy Council, member
 Young Texans Legislative Caucus, member
 Rural Caucus, member
 House Republican Caucus, member
 Conroe YMCA, former Board member and Finance Committee member
 Homeland Security & Public Safety Committee, former member
 Natural Resources Committee, former vice-chairman
 Conroe Industrial Development Corporation Board, former chair of Finance & board member
 Redistricting Committee, former member 
 Subcommittee on Small Business, former member
 Greater Conroe Economic Development, former Board member and Executive Committee member
 Montgomery County Fair Association Advisory Board, Past vice-chairman
 Livestock Auction Committee (2012–2013), former vice-chairman, and as of 2022 Committee Board member, and member of the Advisory Board.
 Class of 2014 Leadership Montgomery County, member
 Conroe Noon Lions Club, member
 Fellowship of Montgomery, member
 First Baptist Church Conroe Finance Committee, 3-year term
 First Baptist Academy, 2-year term Board of Trustees chairman
 Montgomery Independent School District Education Foundation, Board member and Treasurer
 Lifetime Member of the Montgomery County Fair Association, Friends of Conroe, NRA, 100 Club, and the Sam Houston State University Alumni Association

References

Living people
1984 births
Republican Party members of the Texas House of Representatives
People from Conroe, Texas
Conroe High School alumni
Sam Houston State University alumni
American bankers
Businesspeople from Texas
American Christians
21st-century American politicians